The 2018 Italian Basketball Cup, known as the 2018 PosteMobile Final Eight for sponsorship reasons, was the 50th edition of Italy's national cup tournament. The competition is managed by the Lega Basket for LBA clubs. The tournament was played from 15 to 18 February 2018 in Florence, at the end of the first half of the 2017–18 LBA season.

EA7 Emporio Armani Milano were the defending champions.

Fiat Torino went to win its first Cup ever by beating Germani Basket Brescia 69–67 in the Finals. Vander Blue was named Finals MVP of the competition.

Qualification
Qualified for the tournament were selected based on their position on the league table at the end of the first half of the 2017–18 LBA regular season.

Bracket

Quarterfinals

Sidigas Avellino vs. Vanoli Cremona

Umana Reyer Venezia vs. Fiat Torino

EA7 Emporio Armani Milano vs. Red October Cantù

Germani Basket Brescia vs. Segafredo Virtus Bologna

Semifinals

Vanoli Cremona vs. Fiat Torino

Red October Cantù vs. Germani Basket Brescia

Final
In the final game Sasha Vujačić’s layup in the dying seconds lifted Fiat Torino to a 69-67 victory over Germani Basket Brescia for the club’s first Italian Cup. After a series of threes in the closing seconds left the game tied, Brescia had the ball for what appeared to be the final possession, however Marcus Landry and Luca Vitali each missed from downtown, Deron Washington picked up the loose ball and started a fast break that Vujacic finished with the winning layup. Diante Garrett paced Fiat with 16 points, Nobel Boungou Colo and Vander Blue added 11 points apiece and Washington scored 10 for the winners. Landry paced Brescia with 22 points and 9 rebounds and Michele Vitali added 14 points in defeat.

Fiat Torino vs. Germani Basket Brescia

Sponsors

Source:

References

External links
LBA Final Eight official website

2017–18 in Italian basketball
21st century in Florence
February 2018 sports events in Italy
Italian Basketball Cup